The Advanced Materials and Processes Research Institute, Bhopal, formerly known as the Regional Research Laboratory, is a research laboratory in Bhopal, Madhya Pradesh in India. It was established in May 1981.

History
AMPRI is a research institution of CSIR. It was earlier known as RRL Bhopal when the new name was adopted by Governing Body of CSIR. It was started in a building originally build for Cooperative Training College with 15 Scientist. The building for Cooperative training college was changed into what is called today Main Building, the boys hostel was modified to accommodate Administration building and the Girls hostel is now known as MEMS Laboratory.

Staff
CSIR AMPRI has around 100 Permanent Regular staff, 150 contract workers and 150 in form of Research Scholars, Project Assistants, PhD and MTech Students. The Regular staff like other Laboratories of CSIR is classified into four categories (i) Scientific (ii) Technical (iii) Auxiliary technical and (iv) Administrative. Director is the apex post in CSIR AMPRI.

Courses 
Under Academy of Scientific and Innovative Research AcSir various courses are offered by CSIR AMPRI, Bhopal. It includes admission to Ph.D (Sciences), Ph.D (Engineering), M.Tech, M.Sc and IDDP(Integrated Dual Degree Program in Engineering -M.Tech+Ph.D.

Admission 
Students are selected as per Admission Calendar by AcSir in August and January sessions. Reservations is available as per Government of India rules.

References

External links
AMPRI

Scientific organisations based in India
Council of Scientific and Industrial Research
Research institutes in Bhopal
1982 establishments in Madhya Pradesh
Research institutes established in 1982